Reginald Arkell (14 October 1881 – 1 May 1959) was a British script writer and comic novelist who wrote many musical plays for the London theatre. The most popular of those was an adaptation of the spoof history book 1066 and All That: 1066—and all that: A Musical Comedy based on that Memorable History by Sellar and Yeatman. He was the author of A Cottage in the Country and the Green Fingers series of garden verse.

Arkell was born on 14 October 1882 at Lechlade, Gloucestershire, England, was educated at Burford Grammar School and trained as a journalist. He married actress Elizabeth Evans in 1912. During the First World War he served with the King's Own Yorkshire Light Infantry and The Norfolk Regiment. He also scripted a propaganda comic book, Bosch the soldier, illustrated by Alfred Leete. Arkell died on 1 May 1959 at Cricklade, England.

Works
The Round House (1958, novel)
Charley Moon (1953, novel, published by Michael Joseph Ltd)
"Trumpets Over Merriford" (1955, American title: The Miracle Of Merriford, 1956, novel) 
Collected Green Fingers (1956, poems)
Come to the ball; or, Harlequin (1951, adaptation of Johann Strauss II's Die Fledermaus)
Old Herbaceous (1950, republished 2002)
Green fingers Again (1942, poems) 
War Rumours (1939, verse, illustrated by Edgar Norfield)
Percy Ponsonby (1939, TV series)
1066 And All That (1939, TV version)
The Street Singer or Interval for Romance (1937, film musical which starred Arthur Tracy)
Smash and Grab (1937, film)
Green fingers, and other poems (1934, includes Roses at Owlpen)
The Last Waltz (1936, film of the musical comedy)
1066 And All That (1935, revue)
A Kingdom for a Cow (1935, adaptation of Kurt Weill's operetta Der Kuhhandel)
Playing the Games (1935, humour)
Bridge Without Sighs (1934, A Harmless Handbook to the game, written in rhyme)
Richard Jefferies (1933, biography)
Winter Sportings (1929)
 Meet These People (1928, poetry with caricatures by Bert Thomas, published by Herbert Jenkins)
Columbine – A Fantasy of Summertime (1928, adaptation for radio)
The Blue Train (1927, musical, music by Robert Stolz, additional lyrics by Ivy St. Helier)
Frasquita (1925, operetta, music by Franz Lehár)
Our Nell (1924, musical play, music by Ivor Novello and Harold Fraser-Simson)
The tragedy of Mr. Punch (1923, play)
Columbine (1922, play)
Catherine  (1922, musical play, music by Tchaikovsky)
The Last Waltz (1922, musical comedy, music by Oscar Straus)
All the Rumors (1916, contains the poem Actual Evidence I Have None ..., published by Duckworth & Company, 1916
World War, 1914-1918 (47 pp.)
"The Holidays" (Children's poem in The Captain, December 1910)

Old Herbaceous
Old Herbaceous is a classic British novel of the garden, with a title character as outsized and unforgettable as P. G. Wodehouse’s immortal manservant, Jeeves. Born at the dusk of the Victorian era, Bert Pinnegar, an awkward orphan child with one leg a tad longer than the other, rises from inauspicious schoolboy days spent picking wildflowers and dodging angry farmers to become the legendary head gardener "Old Herbaceous," the most esteemed flower-show judge in the county and a famed horticultural wizard capable of producing dazzling April strawberries from the greenhouse and the exact morning glories his Lady spies on the French Riviera, "so blue, so blue it positively hurts."

Sprinkled with nuggets of gardening wisdom, Old Herbaceous is a witty comic portrait of the most archetypal—and crotchety—head gardener ever to plant a row of bulbs at a British country house.

References

External links

BBC page on Percy Ponsonby

1881 births
1959 deaths
Military personnel from Gloucestershire
British garden writers
English biographers
English humorists
English male journalists
English non-fiction writers
People from Lechlade
British Army personnel of World War I
British male poets
British male dramatists and playwrights
English male novelists
British comics writers
20th-century English poets
20th-century English novelists
20th-century English dramatists and playwrights
20th-century English male writers
King's Own Yorkshire Light Infantry soldiers
Royal Norfolk Regiment soldiers
Male biographers